Parliamentary elections were held in Senegal on 1 July 2012. The result was a landslide victory for the United in Hope coalition supporting newly elected President Macky Sall, which won 119 of the 150 seats in the National Assembly. Voter turnout in the election was just 37%.

Background
Changes to the electoral law passed in 2010 made it mandatory for women to make up 50% of candidates on party lists. A total of 24 lists were submitted for the election, with over 7,000 candidates, including Laurence Gavron, the first white woman to run for election to Parliament.

Of the 150 seats in the National Assembly, 60 were elected through proportional representation and 90 in constituencies.

The election had originally been scheduled for 17 June 2012, but President Macky Sall announced a change of date after saying there was not enough time to prepare for it and that he had consulted the opposition Senegalese Democratic Party (PDS) on the move.

Results
As a result of the new law on equal representation on party lists, 64 women were elected to the Assembly.

The United in Hope coalition included the Alliance for the Republic.

Aftermath
The pro-Sall United in Hope coalition won an overwhelming majority of seats in the National Assembly, 119 out of 150, while the PDS saw its share of seats plummet to only 12. The remaining 19 seats were distributed amongst an assortment of small parties. On 30 July 2012, one of Sall's most prominent allies, Moustapha Niasse, was elected as President of the National Assembly; he defeated a PDS deputy, Oumar Sarr. Niasse received 126 votes against 17 votes for Sarr; there were three blank votes. Eight vice-presidents were elected, including Awa Guèye as First Vice-President and Moustapha Cissé Lô as Second Vice-President. None of the vice-president posts went to a deputy from the opposition, leading it to complain that the majority had excluded it and ignored parliamentary tradition. While the opposition Liberals and Democrats Parliamentary Group was too few in number to guarantee it one of the posts, the opposition nevertheless felt that it should have been given a post for reasons of tradition and "dignity".

References

Elections in Senegal
Senegal
2012 in Senegal
July 2012 events in Africa